ViaSat-3 is a global constellation of three geostationary Ka-band communications satellites, set to launch in 2023 by Viasat, Inc. The satellites are intended to provide broadband connectivity with speeds of 100-plus megabits per second to homes, business and enterprise internet users, commercial, government and business aircraft, as well as government and defense markets, maritime and oceanic enterprises in the Americas, Europe, the Middle East, Africa and Asia-Pacific.

Satellites
The satellites were first announced in 2015. In February 2016, Viasat announced a partnership with Boeing Satellite Systems. For each of the three ViaSat-3 class satellites, Viasat will build the satellite payload, integrate the payload into the Boeing-provided payload module. Boeing will provide the scalable 702 satellite platform, system integration and test, launch vehicle integration and mission operations services. Each ViaSat-3 satellite payload is being manufactured at Viasat's own manufacturing facility in Tempe, Arizona, using modular structures from Boeing Satellite Systems in El Segundo, California. The satellites are projected to have a total network capacity over 1 terabit per second.

ViaSat-3 consists of three separate satellites, each designed to provide coverage to select global regions: ViaSat-3 (Americas) will cover the Americas; ViaSat-3 (EMEA) will cover Europe, the Middle East and Africa; and ViaSat-3 (APAC) will cover the Asia-Pacific regions. The ViaSat-3 (Americas) and ViaSat-3 (EMEA) satellites at one time were expected to launch about six months apart starting in 2021, with the ViaSat-3 (APAC) satellite projected to launch in the second half of 2022. However, in February, 2021, ViaSat's CEO announced that the company does not expect to launch the first satellite until early 2022. It will then take several months for the satellite to be in full service, because of necessary testing.

Viasat has three launch contracts, one for each ViaSat-3 class satellite. In 2016, the company announced plans to launch the first satellite with Arianespace on an Ariane 6 rocket. And in 2018, announced that the second one will be launched with United Launch Alliance on an Atlas V, and the third one with SpaceX on the Falcon Heavy.

The Falcon Heavy rocket covering the Americas and the EMEA on an Atlas V rocket are currently scheduled to launch in 2023.

References 

2023 in spaceflight
Communications satellite constellations
Communications satellites in geostationary orbit
Communications satellites of the United States